Sophie Dupuis is a Quebec film director and screenwriter, from Val-d'Or who studied at Concordia University and the Université du Québec à Montréal
 whose feature film debut Family First (Chien de garde) premiered in 2018 and was selected as Canada's submission for the Best Foreign Language Film at the 91st Academy Awards.

The film was nominated for eight Prix Iris at the 20th Quebec Cinema Awards, including a Best Director nomination for Dupuis.

Prior to Family First, Dupuis directed the short films J'viendrais t'chercher, Si tu savais Rosalie, Félix et Malou, Faillir and L'hiver et la violence.

Her second feature film, Underground (Souterrain), was released in 2020.

References

External links

Canadian women film directors
Canadian screenwriters in French
Canadian women screenwriters
Film directors from Quebec
Writers from Quebec
People from Val-d'Or
French Quebecers
Living people
Year of birth missing (living people)